The Women's 400 metres T53 event at the 2012 Summer Paralympics took place at the London Olympic Stadium on 8 September. The event consisted of a single race.

Records
Prior to the competition, the existing World and Paralympic records were as follows:

Results

Competed 8 September 2012 at 21:42.

 
Q = qualified by place. q = qualified by time. RR = Regional Record. PB = Personal Best. SB = Seasonal Best.

References

Athletics at the 2012 Summer Paralympics
2012 in women's athletics
Women's sport in London